The 1990 Kuala Lumpur–Karak Highway crash was a highway pile-up took place in Gombak District, Selangor, Malaysia on 28 February 1990. About 17 people were killed when the passenger bus collided with a tanker lorry, FRU riot police vehicles, a lorry, two taxis and six cars at kilometre 30.9 of the Kuala Lumpur–Karak Highway about 5 km from Genting Sempah Tunnel at Selangor–Pahang border. 11 FRU riot police personal were killed too. Many vehicles to and from Kuala Lumpur were trapped in a massive jams for five hours. This was the worst highway disaster in Malaysia since Kuala Lumpur–Karak Highway was opened to traffic in 1979.

See also
 List of Royal Malaysian police officers killed in the line of duty
 List of road accidents

References
 Adopted from Kemalangan Paling Buruk di Lebuhraya - Buku Rekod Malaysia Edisi Kedua, Ghulam Jie M Khan
 Adopted from the title of 22 January year 1990 articles - Century Clips, New Straits Times 31 December 1999
 Adopted from ''the title of 22 January year 1990 articles - Chronicles of Malaysia (1957–2007)

Kuala Lumpur–Karak Highway Crash, 1990
Kuala Lumpur–Karak Highway Crash, 1990
Gombak District
Road incidents in Malaysia
1990 disasters in Malaysia